Christian Jimenez (born November 3, 1986) is an American former soccer player.

Career

Jimenez trained with the United States under-17 national team at the USSF's Bradenton Academy from the Fall 2002 to Spring 2004, and competed in a Youth World Championship.  Upon graduating from Bradenton, Jimenez moved to the University of South Florida along with Rodrigo Hidalgo.  At USF he played only one season of college soccer, appearing in 17 games and registering four goals and four assists, before turning professional by signing a Generation Adidas contract with MLS.

Jimenez was selected 14th overall in the 2005 MLS SuperDraft by Chivas USA, a team dedicated to fielding a largely Hispanic, Spanish-speaking team in MLS. He never played a first-team match for Chivas and was traded to Real Salt Lake after the 2005 season along with Douglas Sequeira for Brian Dunseth. He made one appearance in the 2006 season, but missed the rest of the season due to a torn ACL to his left knee. Failing to make an impact in 2007, he was waived by ownership and coach Jason Kreis.

References

External links
 
 
 Player profile at Yahoo!

1986 births
Living people
American soccer players
San Gabriel Valley Highlanders players
Chivas USA players
Real Salt Lake players
American sportspeople of Mexican descent
South Florida Bulls men's soccer players
USL League Two players
Major League Soccer players
United States men's youth international soccer players
United States men's under-20 international soccer players
Chivas USA draft picks
People from San Dimas, California
Association football midfielders